James Farmer (1920–1999) was one of the leaders of the U.S. Civil Rights Movement in the 1950s and 1960s.

James Farmer may also refer to:

 James Farmer (politician) (1823–1895), representing Marsden (and other electorates) in the New Zealand Parliament
 James Farmer (industrialist) (1823–1892), British industrialist and mayor of the County Borough of Salford
 James Farmer (lawyer) (born 1941), New Zealand barrister and jurist; Queen's Counsel
 James L. Farmer Sr. (1886–1961), first African-American Texan to earn a doctorate
 Jim Farmer (born 1964), American basketball player
 Jim Farmer (runner) (born 1965), American distance runner
 James N. Farmer (born 1976), online education and WordPress pioneer, founder of Edublogs
 J. Doyne Farmer (born 1952), American physicist and entrepreneur
 Ted Farmer (James Edward Colm Farmer, born 1940), English footballer